Malawi competed in the 2014 Commonwealth Games in Glasgow, Scotland from 23 July to 3 August 2014.

Athletics

Men
Track & road events

Women
Track & road events

Boxing

Men

Cycling

Mountain biking

Road
Men

Judo

Men

Netball

Roster

 Jane Chimaliro
 Joanna Kachilika
 Tina Kamzati
 Mwai Kumwenda
 Takondwa Lwazi
 Beatrice Mpinganjira
 Caroline Mtukule
 Joyce Mvula
 Grace Mwafulirwa
 Loreen Ngwira
 Sindi Simtowe
 Towera Vikhumbo

Pool A

5th place match

Swimming

Women

Table Tennis

Singles

Doubles

Weightlifting

Men

References

Nations at the 2014 Commonwealth Games
Malawi at the Commonwealth Games
Com